Keith Szarabajka (born December 2, 1952) is an American actor. He is best known for his roles as Mickey Kostmayer on The Equalizer, Daniel Holtz on Angel, Gerard Stephens in The Dark Knight and Adam Engell in Argo. He has also voiced Dr. Terrence Kyne in Dead Space, Harbinger in Mass Effect 2, Herschel Biggs in L.A. Noire and the Didact in Halo 4.

Early life
Szarabajka was born in Oak Park, Illinois on December 2, 1952, the son of Anne, a school teacher, and Edward Szarabajka, a savings and loan officer. His father was a much decorated veteran of WWII. He fought in North Africa and Italy until the end of the war. He received the Silver Star, two Bronze Stars and the Purple Heart.

He attended Campion Jesuit High School in Prairie du Chien, Wisconsin, John Hersey High School in Arlington Heights, Illinois, and the University of Chicago, as well as Trinity University in San Antonio, Texas. He studied acting further at the Organic Theater in Chicago from 1972 to 1978. During this time, he co-wrote "Bleacher Bums" along with, among others, Joe Mantegna and Stuart Gordon. In 1982 he had a supporting role in the Costa-Gavras film Missing.

Career
His acting resume is extensive, appearing in numerous television programs including The Equalizer, Profit, The X-Files, Becker, Star Trek: Voyager, Star Trek: Enterprise, Charmed, Roswell, 24, Max Steel, The Inside, and Law & Order.  In 1994 he portrayed Matthew Stoner in Babylon 5 episode "Soul Mates". He is known for his role as Mickey Kostmayer in the 1980s show The Equalizer, as well as for his recurring role as vampire hunter Daniel Holtz in the cult series Angel, the spin-off from Buffy the Vampire Slayer. He played the lead role in Stephen King's Golden Years. In 2016, he began the recurring guest role of Donatello Redfield in Supernatural, appearing in nine episodes before the show's conclusion in 2020.

Szarabajka has contributed his voice to several audio books, notably Fierce Invalids Home from Hot Climates by Tom Robbins, for which he won the 2001 Audie Award for Best Fiction, Unabridged; Fear Nothing and Seize the Night by Dean Koontz; several roles in a Grammy nominated audio dramatization of The Maltese Falcon, Rising Sun by Michael Crichton; Nelson Algren's Walk on the Wild Side; and The Mark of Zorro opposite Val Kilmer. Szarabajka is the voice of Russman in Call of Duty: Black Ops 2.

Additionally, he provided the voice for antagonist Dmitri Yuriev in the Xenosaga series and for The Master of Whispers in the game Guild Wars: Nightfall and for Emile Dufraisne in Tom Clancy's Splinter Cell: Double Agent. He played the role of Detective Gerard Stephens in the Batman Begins sequel The Dark Knight and voiced Dr. Terrence Kyne for the animated sci-fi horror movie Dead Space: Downfall based on the Dead Space video game. He also voiced a minor character in Condemned 2: Bloodshot named Inferi.

He is the Archangel Azrael in Darksiders: Wrath of War and played a very small role in Dragon Age: Origins as a nameless dwarf collecting nugs, a voiceset for male dwarf characters, and several minor characters.  He plays the Reaper Harbinger, the main villain of the video game Mass Effect 2, as well as a few minor characters. In 2008, he voiced Venom in Spider-Man: Web of Shadows. In 2010, he voiced the Autobot Ironhide in Transformers: War for Cybertron as well as its 2012 sequel Transformers: Fall of Cybertron, and Mr. Freeze in Young Justice. He provides the voice for Gilgamesh in the video game, Dissidia 012 Final Fantasy.  He also provided the voice for Joshua Graham in Honest Hearts, downloadable content for Fallout: New Vegas.

His most recent roles include the narrator Detective Herschel Biggs in the video game LA Noire, the Chaos Advisor and Captain Apollo Diomedes in Relic Entertainment's Dawn of War II: Chaos Rising, Warhammer 40,000: Dawn of War II – Retribution, Laserbeak in Transformers: Dark of the Moon, Bastion in X-Men Destiny, several voices in The Elder Scrolls V: Skyrim, Ronan the Accuser in The Avengers: Earth's Mightiest Heroes, the Living Laser in Ultimate Spider-Man, Azrael The Narrator in Darksiders, the Crowfather in Darksiders II, the Witch-king of Angmar in Guardians of Middle-earth, Russman in Call of Duty: Black Ops II, the Ur-Didact in Halo 4, General Spencer Mahad in Dead Space 3, and Cornelius Slate in BioShock Infinite.

He is also voiced Flameslinger in the Skylanders reboot of the franchise.

On Broadway, he originated the role of B.D. in Doonesbury.

Filmography

Film

Television

Video games

References

External links
 
 
 
 

1952 births
Living people
Actors from Oak Park, Illinois
American male film actors
American male stage actors
American male television actors
American male voice actors
American people of Polish descent
University of Chicago alumni
Trinity University (Texas) alumni
20th-century American male actors
21st-century American male actors
John Hersey High School alumni